Johann Nikolaus von Hontheim (January 27, 1701 – September 2, 1790) was a German historian and theologian. He is remembered as Febronius, the pseudonym under which he wrote his 1763 treatise On the State of the Church and the Legitimate Power of the Roman Pontiff and which gave rise to febronianism.

Biography
Born in Trier, he belonged to a noble family which had been for many generations connected with the court and government of the Electors of Trier, his father, Kaspar von Hontheim, being receiver-general of the Electorate. At the age of twelve, young Hontheim was given by his maternal uncle, Hugo Frederick von Anethan, canon of the collegiate church of St Simeon (which at that time still occupied the Roman Porta Nigra at Trier), a prebend in his church, and on May 13, 1713, he received the tonsure. He was educated by the Jesuits at Trier and at the universities of Trier, Leuven, and Leiden, taking his degree of doctor of laws at Trier in 1724. The works of the Louvain professor Van Espen and his Gallican doctrine had a great influence on Hontheim.

During the following years he traveled in various European countries, spending some time at the German College in Rome; in 1728 he was ordained priest and, formally admitted to the chapter of St Simeon in 1732, he became a professor of the Pandects at the University of Trier.

In 1738 he was sent on official duty by the Elector to Coblenz, where he discharged the duties of official and president of the Grand Séminaire of that city. In that capacity, he had plenty of opportunities to study the effect of the influence of the Roman Curia in the internal affairs of the Empire, notably in the negotiations that preceded the elections of the emperors Charles VII and Francis I in which Hontheim took part as assistant to the electoral ambassador. It appears that it was the claims of the papal nuncio on these occasions and his interference in the affairs of the electoral college that first suggested to Hontheim that critical examination of the basis of the papal involvement, the results of which he afterwards published to the world under the pseudonym of Febronius.

In 1747, broken down by overwork, he resigned his position as an official and retired to St Simeon, of which he was elected dean in the following year. In May 1748 he was appointed by the archbishop-elector Francis George von Schönborn as his auxiliary bishop, being consecrated at Mainz, in February 1749, under the title of bishop of Myriophiri in partibus. Upon Hontheim as auxiliary bishop and vicar-general fell the whole spiritual administration of the diocese; this work, in addition to that of pro-chancellor of the university, he carried on single-handed until 1778, when Jean-Marie Cuchot d'Herbain was appointed his coadjutor. On April 21, 1779, he resigned the deanery of St Simeon's on the ground of old age.

He was a man of short stature, energetic, hard-working, pious, and generous. He died on September 2, 1790, at his château at Montquintin near Orval, an estate which he had purchased. He was buried at first in St Simeon's; but the church was ruined by the French during the revolutionary wars and never restored, and in 1803 the body of Hontheim was transferred to that of St Gervasius.

Historian
As a historian Hontheim's reputation rests on his contributions to the history of Trier. During the period of his activity as official at Coblenz he had found time to collect a vast mass of printed and manuscript material which he afterwards embodied in three works on the history of Trier. Of these the Historia Trevirensis diplomatica et pragmatica was published in 3 folio volumes in 1750, the Prodromus historiae Trevirensis in 2 volumes in 1757. Besides a history of Trier and its constitution, they give a large number of documents and references to published authorities. A third work, the Historiae scriptorum et monumentarum Trevirensis omptissima collectio, remains in manuscript in the city library of Trier. These books, the result of an enormous labor in collation and selection in very unfavorable circumstances, entitle Hontheim to the fame of a pioneer in modern historical methods.

It is, however, as Febronius that Hontheim is best remembered. His 1763 treatise "On the State of the Church and the Legitimate Power of the Roman Pontiff" offered Europe the "foremost formulation of the arguments against papal absolutism in Germany". The author of the book was known at Rome almost as soon as it was published; but it was not till some years afterwards (1778) that he was called on to retract. Threatened with excommunication and faced by the prospect of his relations' loss of their offices, Hontheim, after much vacillation and correspondence, signed a submission which was accepted at Rome as satisfactory. The removal of the censure followed (1781) when Hontheim published in Frankfurt what purported to be a proof that his submission had been made of his own free will (Justini Febronii acti commentarius in suam retractationem, etc.). This book, however, which carefully avoided all the most burning questions, rather tended to show – as indeed his correspondence proves – that Hontheim had not essentially shifted his opinion.

Notes

References
 This work in turn cites:
Otto Mejer, Febronius, Weihbischof Johann Nikolaus von Hontheim und sein Widerruf (Tübingen, 1880) with many original letters
 (with numerous references).

1701 births
1790 deaths
18th-century German Roman Catholic bishops
18th-century German historians
18th-century German Catholic theologians
German Roman Catholic titular bishops
Old University of Leuven alumni
People from Trier
German male non-fiction writers
18th-century German male writers